Events in the year 2017 in Haiti.

Incumbents
 President: Jocelerme Privert (provisional; until 7 February) Jovenel Moïse (from 7 February)
 Prime Minister: Enex Jean-Charles

Events
20 January – second round of the Haitian Senate election, 2016–17
7 February – Jovenel Moïse assumed the position as president.

Deaths

3 March – René Préval, politician, former president (b. 1943).

1 June – Viviane Gauthier, dancer (b. 1918)

References

 
2010s in Haiti
Years of the 21st century in Haiti
Haiti
Haiti